Elena Dostatni, née Khalyavina (born December 8, 1983) is a former competitive ice dancer. Competing for Russia as Elena Khalyavina with partner Maxim Shabalin, she is three times Russian Junior National Championship medalist (bronze in 1999,silver in 2000 and gold in 2001) she won two medals at the ISU Junior Grand Prix Final (silver in 2000 and gold in 2001) and two medals at the World Junior Championships (bronze in 2001, silver in 2002).

Career 
Elena Khalyavina began skating when she was six years old in Kirov. She skated with Alexandr Glyhih for seven years through the senior level. In 1999, she moved to Samara and teamed up with Maxim Shabalin. In the 2001–02 season, Khalyavina/Shabalin won gold at the JGP Final, gold at the Russian Junior Championships, and silver at the World Junior Championships before parting ways. In 2002, she began her coaching career in her home town in Russia. 

In 2011, Elena Dostatni became the director of ice dancing at the Colorado Springs World Arena Ice Hall.

Personal life 
Elena Khalyavina moved to the United States in 2003 and is now known as Elena Dostatni. She married Polish former ice dancer and ISU Technical Specialist Andrzej Dostatni in September 2009. They have two sons.

Programs 
(with Shabalin)

Results 
(with Shabalin)

References

External links
 

Russian female ice dancers
Living people
1983 births
World Junior Figure Skating Championships medalists
Sportspeople from Kirov, Kirov Oblast